Claylick may refer to:

 Claylick, Pennsylvania, unincorporated community in Pennsylvania, United States
 Claylick, Ohio, former town in Ohio, United States

See also 
 Macaw#Diet and clay licks
 Clay lick